bEnd.3 is a mouse brain cell line derived from BALB/c mice. The cell line is commonly used in vascular research and studies of endothelial brain tissue. In particular, bEnd.3 cells can serve as blood–brain barrier models for ischemia.

References

External links
Cellosaurus entry for bEnd.3

Rodent cell lines